Maja e Zezë, meaning black peak, is a mountain in Kosovo and North Macedonia. To the east of the mountain is Peskovi, and to the west of it is Kobilica.

Notes

References:

Šar Mountains
Two-thousanders of Kosovo
Two-thousanders of North Macedonia